The Days of Water is a 1971 Cuban drama film directed by Manuel Octavio Gómez. It was entered into the 7th Moscow International Film Festival, where it won a Special Prize, the Prix FIPRESCI and Idalia Anreus won the award for Best Actress.

Cast
 Idalia Anreus as Antonica
 Raúl Pomares as Lino
 Adolfo Llauradó as Felipe
 Mario Balmaseda as Toni

References

External links
 

1971 films
1971 drama films
1970s Spanish-language films
Cuban drama films